"Crawl" is a song by American rock band Kings of Leon, and the second track of their 2008 album Only by the Night. It was the first track to be premiered from the album, with the band offering it as a free download on their website for a short period of time. The song was voted number 70 in the Triple J Hottest 100, 2008 countdown. In late October 2009, it was released as a single in Canada and the United States.

It was released as downloadable content for the Rock Band music video game series on July 21, 2009.

Charts
The song charted at #70 in Australia upon the album's release in 2008.

References

2008 songs
Songs written by Caleb Followill
Songs written by Nathan Followill
Songs written by Jared Followill
Songs written by Matthew Followill
Kings of Leon songs
Song recordings produced by Jacquire King